The Ohio State University Wexner Medical Center is a multidisciplinary academic medical center located in Columbus, Ohio, United States, on the main campus of The Ohio State University. 
For 29 consecutive years, U.S. News & World Report has recognized Ohio State Wexner Medical Center specialties in its "Best Hospitals" rankings. In 2021, it recognized 10 Ohio State Wexner Medical Center specialties: Ear, Nose and Throat #8; Diabetes and Endocrinology #19; Cancer #27; Neurology and Neurosurgery #28; Pulmonology and Lung Surgery #29; Urology #31; Rehabilitation #31; Cardiology and Heart Surgery #38; Gynecology #46; and Gastroenterology and GI Surgery #50. USNWR also named the Ohio State Wexner Medical Center the best hospital in central Ohio and the second best hospital in the state.

In 2022, only one program was rated in the top 20 (Ear Nose and Throat #19), and two previously-ranked programs were unranked (Diabetes and Endocrinology; Urology).

Ohio State Health System 

The Ohio State Health System includes University Hospital and East Hospital, Ohio State's two full-service teaching hospitals. Other hospitals include Ohio State Harding Hospital, an inpatient and outpatient psychiatric hospital; the Richard M. Ross Heart Hospital, dedicated to the study, treatment and prevention of cardiovascular diseases; Ohio State Brain and Spine Hospital, meeting the specialized needs of patients with acute brain and spine disorders; Dodd Rehabilitation Hospital, with a rehabilitation inpatient program; and the OSU Primary Care Network, an extensive network of community-based primary and subspecialty care facilities throughout central Ohio.

More than 62,000 inpatients receive medical care annually from The Ohio State University Wexner Medical Center, and the Health System manages more than 1.86 million outpatient visits each year.

The Wexner Medical Center has more than 23,000 employees, including more than 1,800 physicians, more than 900 residents and fellows and nearly 5,200 nurses.

James Cancer Hospital and Solove Research Institute 

The Arthur G. James Cancer Hospital and Richard J. Solove Research Institute is a dedicated cancer hospital and research center that is part of the university's Comprehensive Cancer Center, with a governance structure separate from, but coordinated with, Ohio State Wexner Medical Center. The OSUCCC – James is one of several cancer programs in the United States that features a National Cancer Institute (NCI)-designated comprehensive cancer center aligned with a nationally ranked academic medical center and a freestanding cancer hospital.

The Ohio State University College of Medicine 

The Ohio State University College of Medicine is the medical school at The Ohio State University. The college is recognized in both education and research, as reflected by 2022 rankings in the Top 40 U.S. News & World Report. In the 2022 “Best Graduate Schools” rankings, The Ohio State University College of Medicine ranked 33rd among all research medical schools in the nation.

Expansion

In 2017, Ohio State announced plans for the development of a new hospital and several large ambulatory centers. The new medical tower will include more than 800 beds, 60 neonatal intensive care unit bassinets, and state-of-the-art inpatient service areas. University leaders hope the new hospital tower will be completed by 2025.

References

External links 

 

Medical Center
Hospitals in Columbus, Ohio
University District (Columbus, Ohio)
Level 1 trauma centers
Trauma centers
Les Wexner